The 1944 Swedish Ice Hockey Championship was the 22nd season of the Swedish Ice Hockey Championship, the national championship of Sweden. Sodertalje SK won the championship.

Tournament

First Qualification round 
 IF Göta Karlstad - IFK Stockholm 2:1
 IK Warpen - Strömsbro IF 3:6
 Uddens IF - Tranebergs IF (W)
 Brobergs IF - IK Huge (W) 
 Forshaga IF - Atlad Diesels IF 4:2
 Wifsta/Östrands IF - IFK Nyland 4:2
 Lycksele SK - Skellefteå IF 3:10
 Brynäs IF - Sandvikens IF 6:1

Second Qualification round 
 IFK Mariefred - Stallarholmens AIK 7:3
 Mora IK - Karlbergs BK 3:5
 BK Forward - IK Sleipner 0:1
 Västerås SK - Nacka SK 2:6
 Skuru IK - Djurgårdens IF 0:1
 IFK Lidingö - Matteuspojkarna 0:7
 IF Vesta - Reymersholms IK 0:6
 Södertälje IF - Årsta SK 3:2
 IF Göta Karlstad - Forshaga 7:3
 Strömsbro IF - Tranebergs IF 0:2
 Skellefteå IF - Wifsta/Östrands IF 2:5
 Brynäs IF - IK Huge 3:2

1/8 Finals
 IF Göta Karlstad - Hammarby IF 0:7
 Södertälje IF - IK Sleipner 6:3
 Brynäs IF - Wifsta/Östrands IF 2:6
 IFK Mariefred - Nacka SK 1:5
 Södertälje SK - AIK 3:1
 Karlbergs BK - Djurgårdens IF 6:2
 IK Göta - Tranebergs IF 5:1
 UoIF Matteuspojkarna - Reymersholm IK 1:0

Quarterfinals 
 Hammarby IF - Södertälje IF 7:0
 Wifsta/Östrand - Nacka SK 3:3/2:5
 Södertälje SK - Karlberg 5:2
 IK Göta - UoIF Matteuspojkarna 6:2

Semifinals 
 Hammarby IF - Nacka SK 7:1
 Södertälje SK - IK Göta 3:1

Final 
 Hammarby IF - Södertälje SK 2:3

External links
 Season on hockeyarchives.info

Cham
Swedish Ice Hockey Championship seasons